Palakonda Assembly constituency is an ST reserved constituency in Parvathipuram Manyam district of Andhra Pradesh. It is one of the seven assembly segments of Araku (ST) (Lok Sabha constituency), along with Kurupam (ST), Salur, Paderu (ST) and Rampachodavaram.  , there are a total of 184,414 electors in the constituency. Viswasarayi Kalavathi is the present MLA of the constituency, who won the 2019 Andhra Pradesh Legislative Assembly election from YSR Congress Party.

Mandals 
The four mandals that form the assembly constituency are:

Members of Legislative Assembly

Election results

Assembly elections 1952

Assembly Elections 2004

Assembly Elections 2009

Assembly elections 2014

Assembly elections 2019

See also 
 List of constituencies of Andhra Pradesh Legislative Assembly

References 

Assembly constituencies of Andhra Pradesh